Unico is an anime franchise.

Unico or UNICO may also refer to:

 UNICO, technology transfer organisation
 Unico National
 Unico Properties, American real estate development company based in Seattle, Washington
 Unico Wilhelm van Wassenaer (1692–1766), diplomat and composer
 Unico (wine), notable Spanish wine label produced by Vega Sicilia
 Único, album by Abel Pintos
 Único (album), a 2009 album by Alejandra Guzmán
 "Unico" (song), a 2016 song by Lali Espósito
 Uniana, Korean video game development company known as Unico until 2001
 Unico, a Canadian-based food processing company producing various canned and dried products including dried pasta, canned tomatoes, canned beans, and olive oil

See also
 Unikko; an iconic family of floral (poppy) fabric patterns from the Marimekko company.
 UNICOPAY; see TIPANET
 UNICOS, operating system